Philipp Andreas Oldenburger was a renowned 17th century lawyer and political historian from Germany. 

After writing a pamphlet that offended German authorities, he was placed under arrest and sentenced to eat his writings. While carrying out his sentence, he was flogged, with orders given not to stop the flogging until he had eaten the last page.

Oldenburger died in 1678.

References

17th-century German lawyers
1678 deaths
Year of birth unknown
German male non-fiction writers